Rodriguésia is a peer-reviewed open-access scientific journal covering all aspects of botany with an emphasis on South America. It was established in 1935 and is published by the  Rio de Janeiro Botanical Garden. The editor-in-chief is Karen Lucia De Toni (Rio de Janeiro Botanical Garden).

Abstracting and indexing
The journal is abstracted and indexed in EBSCO databases, Latindex, Referativnyi Zhurnal, and Scopus.

References

External links

Botany journals
Continuous journals
Publications established in 1935
English-language journals
Creative Commons Attribution-licensed journals